Neil A. Hawryliw (November 9, 1955 – October 3, 2021) was a Canadian professional ice hockey right winger who played in one National Hockey League game for the New York Islanders during the 1981–82 NHL season.

Hawryliw signed with the Islanders in 1978 but, because the Islanders of the time were deep in talent, Hawryliw was largely confined to the Central Professional Hockey League and the International Hockey League.

After retiring from hockey, Hawryliw was director of the L.C. Walker Arena in Muskegon, Michigan. He married Joni Miller in 1982 and had one son, Nigel. Hawryliw died on October 3, 2021 in Norton Shores, Michigan.

Career statistics

Regular season and playoffs

See also
List of players who played only one game in the NHL

References

External links

1955 births
2021 deaths
Canadian ice hockey right wingers
Canadian people of Ukrainian descent
Fort Worth Texans players
Ice hockey people from Saskatchewan
Indianapolis Checkers (CHL) players
Kalamazoo Wings (1974–2000) players
Muskegon Lumberjacks players
Muskegon Mohawks players
New York Islanders players
Saskatoon Blades players
Undrafted National Hockey League players
Wichita Wind players